Virgin is first album released by a Polish rock band Virgin in 2002.

Track listing 
"Dzieci Ziemi" ("Children of the Earth") - 3:40
"9 Życzeń" ("9 wishes") - 2:42
"To Ty" ("It's you") - 3:44
"Nie Złość Dody" ("Don't make Doda angry") - 3:37
"Nie Tak - Do Mnie Mówi Się!" ("It's not how one talks to me") - 3:29
"Nie Odpowiadaj" ("Don't answer") - 3:34
"Na Niby" ("Not for real") - 2:26
"Masz Jeszcze Czas" ("You still have time") - 2:54
"Czekam" ("I'm waiting") - 1:47
"Punkowy" ("Punk style") - 1:37
"Mam Tylko Ciebie" ("I have only you") - 3:18
"Sława - A za Co To?" ("Fame - for what?") - 2:54
"Material Girl" - 2:26 
"Będę Dziś Szalona" ("Today I'll be crazy") - 3:01
"Sagan Ohm Warr" - 2:53 
"To Ty" ("It's you") - 4:02

2002 debut albums
Virgin (band) albums